Susanomira is a genus of flies in the family Sepsidae.

Species
Susanomira caucasica Pont, 1987

References

Sepsidae
Diptera of Europe
Brachycera genera